Marie de Bourbon may refer to:

 Marie de Bourbon, Princess of Achaea  (c. 1315–1387), empress consort of Robert of Taranto
 Marie of Bourbon (1347–1401), prioress of Poissy and daughter of Isabella of Valois, Duchess of Bourbon and Peter I, Duke of Bourbon
 Marie de Bourbon, Duchess of Calabria (1428–1448), daughter of Charles I, Duke of Bourbon
 Mary of Bourbon (1515–1538), daughter of Charles, Duke of Vendôme
 Marie de Bourbon, Duchess of Montpensier (1605–1627)
 Marie de Bourbon, Countess of Soissons (1606–1692)
 Princess Maria Pia of Bourbon-Two Sicilies (1849–1882)
 Princess Maria di Grazia of Bourbon-Two Sicilies (1878–1973)

See also
 Marie Anne de Bourbon